The Volta Ciclística de Porto Alegre was a multi-day road cycling race held annually from 1996 to 2006 around Porto Alegre, Brazil. It added to the UCI calendar in 2004 as a 2.5 event, and as a 2.2 event on the UCI America Tour for its last two editions.

Winners

References

Cycle races in Brazil
Defunct cycling races in Brazil
1996 establishments in Brazil
2006 disestablishments in Brazil
Recurring sporting events established in 1996
Recurring sporting events disestablished in 2006
Sport in Rio Grande do Sul
UCI America Tour races